Allyson Brown (born 1984 or 1985, sometimes credited as Allyson Ava-Brown) is a British actress and singer. She is best known for playing Beatrice in Bear Behaving Badly. Allyson Brown has also appeared in Secret Diary of a Call Girl, Sea of Souls, Holby City and Earth 2. Allyson Brown won a MOBO Award for being the Best Unsigned Act in 1998. Allyson was in the 2008-2009 Les Misérables London Production playing Fantine. She also went on The Voice and sang "Somebody Else's Guy" but did not get through. In 2015 Allyson starred in the critically acclaimed theatre production The Etienne Sisters, written and directed by Che Walker, and in 2019 assumed the role of Angelica Schuyler in the West End production of Hamilton.

References

1980s births
British actresses
Living people
21st-century British  women singers